Mark 26 or variation, may refer to:

 Mark 26 torpedo
 3"/70 Mark 26 gun
 Mark 26 nuclear bomb
 Mark 26 missile launcher
 Spitfire Mk26, an Australian homebuilt aircraft modeled after the WWII British Supermarine Spitfire
 MK 26, variant of the Glock 26 adopted by the US military